Zorilispe acutipennis is a species of beetle in the family Cerambycidae. It was described by Pascoe in 1865. It is known from the Celebes Islands.

References

Apomecynini
Beetles described in 1865